The Cohens and Kellys in Trouble is a 1933 American pre-Code comedy film starring Charlie Murray, Andy Devine, and Maureen O'Sullivan. It is the last film in the Cohens and Kellys series and the first director credit for George Stevens.

Plot
Kelly's daughter falls for a revenue agent, and his divorced wife is after alimony.

Cast
George Sidney - Nathan Cohen
Charles Murray - Patrick Kelly
Maureen O'Sullivan - Mollie Kelly
Andy Devine - Andy Anderson
Jobyna Howland - Queenie Truelove
Maude Fulton - Miss Fern
Frank Albertson - Bob Graham
Henry Armetta - Captain Silva

Preservation status
A copy is held in the Library of Congress collection Packard Campus for Audio-Visual Conservation.

References

External links
 
  
 
 

1933 films
1933 comedy films
American black-and-white films
Films directed by George Stevens
Universal Pictures films
Trouble
1933 short films
American comedy short films
Films about the United States Coast Guard
1930s English-language films
1930s American films